Denim on Ice is the second album by Denim. It was released in 1996. The band went on their first tour supporting Pulp on their stadium tour.

The song "The Great Pub Rock Revival" jokingly namechecks musician Wreckless Eric, who in retaliation penned a scathing response with his group The Hitsville House Band, entitled "Lawrence of Arabia on Ice".

Track listing
All songs written by Lawrence, except where noted.

"The Great Pub Rock Revival" – 4:14
"It Fell Off the Back of a Lorry" – 3:21
"Romeo Jones Is in Love Again" – 1:44
"Brumburger" – 4:23
"The Supermodels" – 4:02
"Shut Up Sidney" – 2:27
"Mrs. Mills" – 3:55
"Best Song in the World" – 2:44
"Synthesisers in the Rain" – 4:59
"Job Centre" – 3:00
"Council Houses" – 2:39
"Glue and Smack" – 3:44
"Jane Suck Died in 77" – 3:09
"Grandad's False Teeth" – 2:53
"Silly Rabbit" – 2:03
"Don't Bite Too Much Out of the Apple" – 3:20
"Myriad of Hoops" – 2:32
"Denim on Ice" – 1:32

Personnel
 Lawrence – Lead Vocals & Lyrics
 Tony Barber – Guitar, Synthesizer
 Bill Bass – Bass, Background Vocals
 K.V. Brake – Engineer
 Paul Brook – Programming
 Kevin Dempsey – Guitar
 Denim – Mixing, Primary Artist, Producer
 Tim Dorney – Electronics, Programming
 Duncan Goddard (Radio Massacre International)- Synthesizer
 Gerry Hogan – Dobro, Guitar, Pedal Steel
 Gerard Johnson – Engineer, Synthesizer, Vocoder
 Alex Jones – Engineer
 Terry Miles – Farfisa Organ, Hammond Organ, Piano, Synthesizer, Background Vocals, Wurlitzer
 Russell Milton – Bass
 Brian O'Shaughnessy –  Engineer, Producer, Roland MC-303, Synthesizer
 Peter Phipps (drummer) – Drums (Simmons kit), Background Vocals
 Sean Read – Background Vocals
 John A. Rivers – Mixing, Clap Trap, Programming
 Neil Scott – Guitar, Background Vocals
 Gerry Shephard – Guitar, Background Vocals
 Steve Walwyn – Guitar
 Norman Watt-Roy – Bass
 John Williams – Roland MC-303
 Pete Z. – Mellotron, Hammond Organ, Piano, Roland MC-303, Synthesizer
 Smithy – Synthesizer, 303, piano, guitar, backing vocals, human beatbox, some arranging

References

1996 albums
Denim (band) albums
The Echo Label albums
New wave albums by English artists